Spiennes is a town of Wallonia and a district of the municipality of Mons, located in the province of Hainaut, Belgium.
 

It was a municipality until the fusion of the Belgian municipalities in 1977.

Heritage

The locality is well known for its neolithic flint mines, which are on the list of UNESCO World Heritage Sites since 2000.

References

Former municipalities of Hainaut (province)
Sub-municipalities of Mons